Traja Gaje "Gage" Golightly (born September 5, 1993) is an American actress. She is best known for her roles as Hayley Steele in the Nickelodeon series The Troop, Erica Reyes in the MTV series Teen Wolf, and Karen in the Amazon Studios series Red Oaks.

Early life 
Golightly grew up in Penn Valley, California, the youngest of four children born to a nurse and a plumber. She was diagnosed with dyspraxia at the age of two, and underwent speech therapy. For the first years of her life, her parents used sign language to communicate with her. Golightly also noted she was clumsy as a child due to impaired motor skills. She studied at Flintridge Sacred Heart Academy.

Career
Golightly decided to become an actress at the age of eight. Her mother took her to Los Angeles, where she found a manager. A year later, Golightly started her career with roles in the 2002 film Speakeasy, and the television film The Long Shot. In 2004, she co-starred in the sci-fi miniseries Five Days to Midnight as Jesse Neumeyer and was in Sudbury, an unsold television pilot. In 2006, she was in the Disney Channel sitcom The Suite Life of Zack & Cody as Vanessa, before appearing in the TNT series Heartland.

She portrayed main character Hayley in the Nickelodeon series The Troop, a series about a group of teenagers who fight monsters. In 2010 and 2011, she had guest roles on True Jackson, VP and Big Time Rush, before a recurring role on Ringer as Tessa, a high school student. In 2012, Golightly had a recurring role on the MTV series Teen Wolf during the show's second season as Erica Reyes, the show's first living female werewolf. Golightly was set to reprise the role during the show's third season, which began filming in late 2012, but the actress only filmed a few cameo scenes. She exited the show as she had been cast as the female lead in a pilot for The CW titled Company Town. In May 2013, it was announced that the pilot had not been greenlit.

Throughout 2011 and 2012 Golightly worked on a Marcus Nispel horror film titled Backmask, which was later retitled Exeter. Golightly also worked on Gone Missing for the Lifetime network, playing the role of Matty. In June 2014, Golightly was cast as a series regular in an Amazon Studios comedy pilot Red Oaks, in which she played the role of Karen. The series began filming their first season in late May 2015. In 2016, Golightly appeared as Karen in the remake of Eli Roth's horror film, Cabin Fever. In May 2016, Golightly was cast as Libby in the dance-comedy film Step Sisters.

Golightly appeared on the short-lived ABC drama, Ten Days in the Valley, as a character named Lynn, in a three episode arc. In February 2018 Golightly was cast in a leading role, playing struggling actress Kate, in The CW television pilot, The End of the World As We Know It. In 2019, Golightly guest starred in three episodes of iZombie before being cast as Grace Durkin in the Paramount series 68 Whiskey.

Filmography

Film

Television

References

External links
 

1993 births
21st-century American actresses
American child actresses
American film actresses
American television actresses
Living people
Place of birth missing (living people)
People from Nevada County, California
Actresses from California
American bisexual actors
Bisexual women
21st-century American LGBT people
Bisexual actresses